Spy Game is a 2001 American action thriller film directed by Tony Scott and starring Robert Redford and Brad Pitt. The film grossed $62 million in the United States and $143 million worldwide on a $115 million budget, and received mostly positive reviews from film critics.

Plot
In 1991, the United States and China are close to a major trade agreement, with the President due to visit China to seal the deal. The Central Intelligence Agency (CIA) learns that its asset Tom Bishop has been arrested at a People's Liberation Army prison in Suzhou and will be executed in 24 hours, unless the U.S. government claims him and bargains for his release. Bishop's actions, unsanctioned by the CIA, risk jeopardizing the agreement. A group of CIA executives summon Nathan D. Muir, a veteran case officer and Bishop's mentor, who plans to retire from the Agency at the end of the day. While purportedly interviewing Muir to learn his history with Bishop, the executives seek a pretext for not intervening on Bishop's imprisonment. Unknown to them, Muir was tipped off about Bishop's capture by fellow CIA veteran Harry Duncan in Hong Kong.

Muir leaks the story to CNN through an MI6 contact, Digby 'Digger' Gibson in Hong Kong, believing that public pressure would force American intervention. They are stalled briefly before a phone call to the FCC from Deputy Director for Operations Charles Harker results in CNN retracting the story as a hoax. Muir met Bishop in 1975, when Bishop was a United States Marine Corps Scout Sniper during the Vietnam War. Muir gives Bishop a mission to eliminate a high-ranking North Vietnamese military officer. Bishop and his spotter Tran are able to assassinate the target despite being compromised, though Bishop takes out a pursuing enemy attack chopper. Bishop escorts the now wounded Tran to safety, impressing Muir. In 1976, Muir recruited Bishop as a CIA asset in Berlin, where Bishop was tasked with procuring assets in East Germany. Then he discusses Bishop's spy work in Beirut in 1985, during the War of the Camps, which was their last mission together.

In a series of flashbacks, Bishop is troubled by Muir's conviction that civilian "assets" who endangered a mission should be sacrificed to preserve the "greater good." After Bishop attempts to countermand Muir during a mission to save the life of an asset, Muir emphasizes that he will not tolerate dissent, and would not rescue Bishop if he was captured going "off the reservation". During a mission in Lebanon, Bishop, posing as a photojournalist, meets relief worker Elizabeth Hadley. While using her to connect with an asset for the mission, they became romantically involved. Muir distrusts Hadley, and reveals to Bishop that she was exiled from the United Kingdom. Hadley later confesses to Bishop that she was involved in the bombing of a Chinese building in Britain, which was supposed to be empty but contained Chinese nationals. Bishop reveals to Hadley his true identity. Muir elects again to sacrifice a civilian asset for the sake of their mission, and Bishop cuts professional ties with Muir. Muir, fearing that Hadley could threaten the Agency and potentially Bishop, makes a deal with the Chinese, exchanging Hadley in return for an arrested U.S. diplomat. Chinese agents kidnap Hadley, and a Dear John letter is forged and left for Bishop.

In the present, Muir realizes that Bishop went to China for Hadley. In a series of misdirections, he forges a directive signed by the Director of Central Intelligence to begin "Operation Dinner Out", a rescue mission spearheaded by a SEAL team that Bishop had developed as a "Plan B" for his own attempt at rescuing Hadley. Using $282,000 of his life savings and a misappropriated file on Chinese coastline satellite imagery, Muir enlists Duncan to assist him in bribing a Chinese energy official to cut power to the prison for 30 minutes, during which time the SEAL rescue team will retrieve Bishop and Hadley. Harker is suspicious that Muir is working against the CIA, but when he confronts Muir before the gathered executives, Muir "confesses" to unprofessionally using company resources to gather information about his intended retirement home, which he has distorted the evidence to support. Bishop is rescued along with Hadley, and surmises that Muir was responsible for saving him when he hears the helicopter pilot refer to "Operation Dinner Out", which was also the code name for an operation Bishop used to get a birthday gift for Muir while they were in Lebanon. When the CIA officials are belatedly informed of the rescue, Muir has already left the building and is seen driving safely off into the countryside.

Cast

 Robert Redford as CIA Case Officer Nathan D. Muir
 Brad Pitt as CIA Operative Tom Bishop
 Catherine McCormack as Elizabeth Hadley
 Stephen Dillane as Deputy Director for Operations Chuck Harker
 Larry Bryggman as Deputy Director of Central Intelligence Troy Folger
 Marianne Jean-Baptiste as Gladys Jennip, Muir's Secretary
 Ken Leung as CIA Agent Li
 David Hemmings as CIA Case Officer Harry Duncan
 Michael Paul Chan as CIA Agent Vincent Vy Ngo
 Garrick Hagon as Director of Central Intelligence Cy Wilson
 Todd Boyce as CIA Agent Robert Aiken
 Matthew Marsh as Dr. William Byars
 Andrew Grainger as CIA Agent Andrew Unger
 Shane Rimmer as The Estate Agent
 Ho Yi as The Prison Warden
 Benedict Wong as CIA Agent Tran
 Adrian Pang as CIA Agent Jiang
 Omid Djalili as CIA Agent Doumet
 Dale Dye as Commander Wiley, USN SEAL
 Demetri Goritsas as CIA Agent Billy Hyland
 Charlotte Rampling as Anne Cathcart
 Matthew Walker as MI6 Agent Digby 'Digger' Gibson
 James Aubrey as CIA Agent Mitch Alford
 Colin Stinton as CIA Agent Henry Pollard
 Amidou as Dr. Ahmed
 Andrea Osvárt as Muir's Cousin in Berlin

Production
The film was made in Morocco between November 5, 2000, to March 19, 2001, and was originally to be directed by Mike van Diem. Pitt passed on playing the title role in The Bourne Identity for this project. It made its worldwide premiere at the Mann National Theatre on November 19, 2001.

Soundtrack

Home video
The film was released by Universal Studios Home Video on DVD and VHS on April 9, 2002.

Reception

Box office
Spy Game opened at number three behind Monsters, Inc. and Harry Potter and the Sorcerer's Stone, earning $21.6 million during its opening weekend, combined with $30.6 million from its first five days. The film grossed $62,362,785 in the United States and $143,049,560 worldwide.

Critical response
Review aggregation website Rotten Tomatoes gave the movie an approval rating of 66% based on 133 reviews, with an average rating of 6.2/10. The website's critical consensus reads: "The outcome of the kinetic Spy Game is never in doubt, but it is fun watching Robert Redford and Brad Pitt work." Metacritic gave the film a score of 63 out of 100 based upon reviews by 29 critics. Audiences polled by CinemaScore gave the film a grade B+.

Roger Ebert of the Chicago Sun-Times gave the film two and a half stars out of four and said, "It is not a bad movie, mind you; it's clever and shows great control of craft, but it doesn't care, and so it's hard for us to care about."

See also 
 China–United States relations

References

External links

 
 

2001 films
2001 action thriller films
2000s spy films
American action thriller films
American political thriller films
American spy films
2000s English-language films
Films about the Central Intelligence Agency
Cold War spy films
Films about security and surveillance
Films set in 1985
Films set in 1991
Films set in Hong Kong
Films set in the 1970s
Universal Pictures films
Beacon Pictures films
Films directed by Tony Scott
Films produced by Douglas Wick
Films produced by Marc Abraham
Films scored by Harry Gregson-Williams
Films shot in Budapest
Films shot in the Czech Republic
Films shot in Morocco
Films shot in Vancouver
Vietnam War films
Films set in Vietnam
Films set in Jiangsu
Films set in East Germany
Films set in Beirut
Films set in Lebanon
Films set in China
2000s American films
Films about capital punishment